Texas Silesian (Polish: Gwara teksaska) is a dialect of the Silesian language used by descendants of immigrant Silesians in American settlements from 1852 to the present. It is a variant of Silesian derived from the Opole dialect. The dialect evolved after Silesian exile around the village of Panna Maria. It contains a distinctive vocabulary for things which were unknown for Polish Silesians.

Allegedly, Texas Silesian is less influenced by German because its speakers emigrated before the Kulturkampf, which added many Germanisms to the continental Silesian The language is tended by its speakers, but they know it only in the spoken form. Texas Silesian has not been replaced by English because the Silesian community is strongly isolated. Nevertheless, Texas Silesian has adopted some words from English.

One of the characteristic features of Texas Silesian phonetics is called mazuration, in which all cz, sz, ż are pronounced , whereas in the stereotypical Silesian of the Katowice urban area they are pronounced . Texas Silesian has given the name for Cestohowa village in Texas - the name is derived from Polish Częstochowa, but, due to this phonetic process, cz became c.

Typical words unlike Silesian

References

Silesian-American culture in Texas
Silesian-American history
Silesian language
Silesian emigrants to the United States
Diaspora languages
Languages of Texas
Slavic languages spoken in North America